Vampira may refer to:

Film
 Maila Nurmi (1922–2008), 1950s TV horror hostess and star of the 1959 film Plan 9 from Outer Space, who performed under the name "Vampira"
 The Vampira Show, the Emmy-nominated TV show that she hosted
 Vampira (1974 film) (also known as Old Dracula), a 1974 comedy film
 Vampira (1994 film)

Song

 "Vampira", a song by Commander Cody of Commander Cody and His Lost Planet Airmen on his 1978 album Flying Dreams
 "Vampira", a song about Maila Nurmi's character by Glenn Danzig, recorded several times by The Misfits and first released on the 1982 album Walk Among Us
 "Vampira", a song by Devin Townsend on the 2006 album Synchestra

Character

 "Vampira", character in the comic Captain Marvel, Jr., issue #116, December 1952.
 "Vampira", character in the 1980 cartoon series Drak Pack